Walter King Stapleton (born June 2, 1934) is a Senior United States circuit judge of the United States Court of Appeals for the Third Circuit and a former United States District Judge of the United States District Court for the District of Delaware.

Education and career

Born in Cuthbert, Georgia, Stapleton received an Artium Baccalaureus degree from Princeton University in 1956. He received a Bachelor of Laws from Harvard Law School in 1959.

He received a Master of Laws from University of Virginia School of Law in 1984. He was in private practice of law in Wilmington, Delaware from 1959–70. He was a deputy attorney general of Delaware from 1963–64.

Federal judicial service
Stapleton was nominated by President Richard Nixon on September 22, 1970, to a seat on the United States District Court for the District of Delaware vacated by Judge Edwin DeHaven Steel Jr. He was confirmed by the United States Senate on October 8, 1970, and received commission six days later. He served as Chief Judge from 1983–85. His service was terminated on May 8, 1985, due to elevation to the Third Circuit.

Stapleton was nominated by President Ronald Reagan on March 27, 1985, to the United States Court of Appeals for the Third Circuit, to a new seat created by 98 Stat. 333. He was confirmed by the Senate on April 3, 1985, and received commission the following day. He assumed senior status on June 2, 1999.

See also
 List of United States federal judges by longevity of service

References

Sources
 

1934 births
20th-century American judges
Harvard Law School alumni
Judges of the United States Court of Appeals for the Third Circuit
Judges of the United States District Court for the District of Delaware
Living people
People from Cuthbert, Georgia
Princeton University alumni
United States court of appeals judges appointed by Ronald Reagan
United States district court judges appointed by Richard Nixon